Frederick IV of Fürstenberg-Heiligenberg (9 May 1563 – 8 August 1617), a member of the Swabian noble house of Fürstenberg, was Count (Graf) of Fürstenberg-Heiligenberg, today a part of Baden-Württemberg, Germany. He was the son of Count Joachim of Fürstenberg (1538–1598) and his wife, Countess Anna of Zimmern.

Marriage and children
On 10 September 1584, he married Countess Elisabeth of Sulz. Together, they had the following children: 
William (1586-1618), married Baroness Polyxena Anna Benigna Popel of Lobkowicz
Joachim Alwig (1587-1617)
Ernst Egon VIII (1588-1635), married Anna Maria, daughter of Prince John George of Hohenzollern-Hechingen
Jacob Louis of Fürstenberg-Wartenberg (1592-1627), married Helena Eleonora of Schwendi
Anna Barbara (1594-1597)
Elizabeth (1595-1602)
Maria Johanna (1597)

Elisabeth died in 1601, and in 1606, Frederick married Maria of Arco, the widow of Wolfgang Rumpf vom Wullroß at Weitra, chamberlain of Emperor Rudolf II. She died however only one year later. The comital title was inherited by Frederick's surviving son Ernst Egon.

References 

Frederick
1563 births
1617 deaths